Bob Paul is a New Zealand former rugby league footballer who represented New Zealand in the 1972 World Cup.

Playing career
Paul played for Wellington. In 1972 he was selected for the New Zealand national rugby league team. He played in three test matches, one against Australia and two at the 1972 World Cup.

He played for the New Zealand Māori side in 1972.

References

New Zealand rugby league players
New Zealand Māori rugby league players
New Zealand Māori rugby league team players
New Zealand national rugby league team players
Rugby league props
Rugby league second-rows
Place of birth missing (living people)
Year of birth missing (living people)
Wellington rugby league team players
Living people